Haziq Kamaruddin (4 July 1993 – 14 May 2021) was a Malaysian sport archer.

Personal life
Haziq was born in Johor Bahru, Johor. A son of Kamaruddin Yusof, he studied at the University of Malaya. He married Shahira Abdul Halim and the couple has no children until his death.

Sport career
Haziq was a Malaysia's recurve men’s team archer and two-time Olympian who had competed the archery event in the London 2012 and Rio 2016 Olympic Games. He also participated in World Archery Championships for four times from 2011 to 2017. Haziq also won gold medals at the 2011 Asian Archery Championships in Tehran, as well as the gold medal at the 2011 Asian Grand Prix in Laos and the bronze at the 2019 Asia Cup in the Philippines. Beside that he won four gold and two silver medals in both individual and team events in the SEA Games from 2011 until 2019.

Awards
Haziq was picked as the recipient of the Johor Athlete Award 2011. Haziq together with Cheng Chu Sian and Khairul Anuar Mohamad made-up the Malaysia men's archery team which was honour as the National Men's Team of the Year in the National Sports Awards 2011. Haziq and national diving athlete Pandelela Rinong was respectively named the Bukit Jalil Sports School Sportsman and Sportswoman for 2012. In 2013, he was named Best Young Athlete at the 2012 Sportswriters Association of Malaysia (SAM)-100PLUS Award.

Death 
Haziq, aged 27, had collapsed after performing subuh prayer of the second day of the Hari Raya Aidilfitri at his house in Kajang before being rushed and pronounced dead at Kajang Hospital at 9.37 am. on 14 May 2021. As the post-mortem was being carry out at the hospital, social media has been abuzz with many speculations connecting his death cause to the COVID-19 pandemic and the vaccination programme which Haziq had just completed, with the second dose of the Pfizer-BioNTech vaccine on 4 May meant for athletes and officials in preparations for the forth coming Tokyo 2020 Olympic Games. The National Sports Council (NSC) instead had said that Haziq's body was tested negative for COVID-19 His body was taken to his wife’s hometown in Merlimau, Melaka for prayers at Surau Al-Taqwa before burial at the Taman Koperasi Serkam Darat Cemetery, at 1.40 am in accordance with COVID-19 standard operating procedure (SOP) of the on-going Movement Control Order (MCO). The Ministry of Health (MOH), had finally issued a statement later after his burial, explaining that Haziq's death was not related to COVID-19 infection nor its vaccination and was due to complications arising from clogged heart blood vessels due to coronary artery atherosclerosis as shown by the post-mortem result.

References

External links

 
 

1993 births
2021 deaths
Johor
Malaysian people of Malay descent
University of Malaya alumni
Malaysian male archers
Olympic archers of Malaysia
Archers at the 2012 Summer Olympics
Archers at the 2016 Summer Olympics
Archers at the 2014 Asian Games
Archers at the 2018 Asian Games
Medalists at the 2014 Asian Games
Asian Games medalists in archery
Asian Games silver medalists for Malaysia
Competitors at the 2011 Southeast Asian Games
Competitors at the 2013 Southeast Asian Games
Competitors at the 2015 Southeast Asian Games
Competitors at the 2017 Southeast Asian Games
Competitors at the 2019 Southeast Asian Games
Southeast Asian Games medalists in archery
Southeast Asian Games gold medalists for Malaysia
Southeast Asian Games silver medalists for Malaysia
Deaths from coronary artery disease
20th-century Malaysian people
21st-century Malaysian people